Jason Alan Kapono (born February 4, 1981) is an American former professional basketball player. He was the first National Basketball Association (NBA) player to lead the league in three-point field goal percentage in two consecutive seasons, and he also won the Three-Point Contest twice (2007, 2008). He won an NBA championship with the Miami Heat in 2006.

Kapono played college basketball for the UCLA Bruins. He was the first player in the school's history to earn first-team All-Pac-10 honors for four years and was also the first UCLA player to lead the team in scoring four straight years. Kapono began his NBA career with the Cleveland Cavaliers, who drafted him in the second round of the 2003 NBA Draft. He later played in the NBA for the Charlotte Bobcats, Miami, Toronto Raptors, Philadelphia 76ers, and the Los Angeles Lakers before joining Panathinaikos B.C. in Greece.

Early life
Kapono was born in Long Beach, California, to Joe and Joni Kapono. Jason prepped at Southern California basketball powerhouse Artesia High School in Lakewood, California, where he was a McDonald's All-American and won several accolades and titles. In his senior year at Artesia he averaged 23.5 points and 9.0 rebounds per game. 

After a successful high school career, he enjoyed an outstanding college career at UCLA, where he finished as the third all-time leading scorer with 2,095 points, was the first Bruin to earn first-team All-Pac-10 honors all four years, and was the only UCLA player to lead the school in scoring four straight years. He also set a school record for most three-pointers made in a game when he connected on 9 of 11 attempts against Washington State on January 4, 2003. Kapono graduated with a degree in history. He was a second-round draft choice of the Cleveland Cavaliers in the 2003 NBA Draft.

Professional career

Cleveland Cavaliers (2003–2004) 
Kapono only played 41 games and started 3 in his first NBA season, although he led the team in three-point field goal percent at 47.7%. He averaged 3.5 PPG for his rookie campaign. He became an efficient 3pt shooter but was also good from the free-throw line, shooting 83% from the stripe. The Cavaliers finished the season 37–45 and missed the playoffs.

Charlotte Bobcats (2004–2005) 
After his rookie season with Cleveland, he was selected by the Charlotte Bobcats in the 2004 expansion draft, where he increased his scoring average from 3.5 to 8.5 points per game. He also made the first block in Bobcats history. Kapono also increased his assist and rebound average this season, although his total FG% including 3pt% slightly declined. This was the Bobcats first ever season and the team was very young and had potential, although they were also inexperienced. The Bobcats finished the season with an 18–64 record and Kapono was a free agent. The Bobcats decided to not re-sign Kapono.

Miami Heat (2005–2007) 
Instead, he was signed as a free agent by the Miami Heat where he was part of the 2005–06 NBA championship team. His scoring took a toll as he had a lesser role on this elite team. His scoring average dropped down to 4.1 for the season, and he only played 51 games in the season. But he won his first and only championship with the Heat. In the 2006–07 season, Kapono's points-per-game average and minutes played significantly increased, and he led the league in three-point percentage with .514, which is close to the all-time single-season three-point percentage record held by Kyle Korver (.536), and is the fourth best percentage in league season history. He averaged a career high in scoring, minutes, and rebounding. Kapono also won the Three-Point Contest in the 2007 All-Star Weekend three-point shoot-out competition by defeating Dirk Nowitzki and Gilbert Arenas in the final round with a score of 24 points which tied Mark Price's record for most points in a final round of the three-point contest. The 2006–2007 season is greatly considered to be the greatest season of his career due to his accomplishments and statistics. Despite this, the defending champions had a disappointing season, finishing with an average 44–38 record and getting swept in the first round by the Chicago Bulls.

Toronto Raptors (2007–2009) 

Kapono became a free agent in the 2007 offseason and signed with the Toronto Raptors on July 11. His statistic averages went down following the 2006–2007 season with the Heat, but he still played well. Kapono led the league in three-point percentage going into the 2008 All-Star weekend. In the final round of the contest, he scored 25 points, tying the all-time single round record set in 1986 and also setting a new finals record. On December 14, 2007, he had a career-high 29 points and pulled down 8 rebounds. He also ended the 2007–08 season as the top three-point shooter in the league. He was the first player in NBA history to have the highest three-point percentage in two consecutive seasons. He helped the Raptors reach the 2008 playoffs. The team finished the season with a 41–41 record and placed 6th in the East. They faced the up-and-coming Orlando Magic who beat the Raptors 4–1. Later in the summer, Kapono was picked for the USA Basketball Select Team which trained with USA Men's Senior National Team in Las Vegas to assist in the buildup to the 2008 Summer Olympics. In the 2008–2009 season the Raptors missed the playoffs with a mediocre 33–49 record.

Philadelphia 76ers (2009–2011) 
On June 9, 2009, Kapono was traded to the Philadelphia 76ers for Reggie Evans. Kapono was a victim of several starting lineup changes throughout the season. Kapono started the season with sparing minutes off the bench, but was later given the starting SF spot, near the end of the season. However, after losing his starting spot two games into the following season, Kapono was back to coming off the bench for sparing minutes. The team finished with an abysmal record for the 2009–2010 season, they went 27–55. The 76ers made the playoffs in 2011, but were outmatched by Kapono's former team; the Miami Heat. They lost the series 1–4. Kapono only averaged 0.7 PPG for that season and he didn't play a second of the 2011 playoffs. After the 2010-2011 NBA season came to an end, Kapono's contract with the 76ers expired and he became a free agent.

Los Angeles Lakers (2011–2012) 
On December 9, 2011, Kapono signed with the Los Angeles Lakers. He only played 27 games for the Lakers. Kapono's final NBA game was played on March 14, 2012, in a 107–101 win over the New Orleans Hornets where he played for four minutes and the only stat he recorded was 1 assist.

Cleveland Cavaliers (2012) 
On March 15, 2012, Kapono was traded along with Luke Walton and a 2012 first-round draft choice to the Cleveland Cavaliers for Ramon Sessions and Christian Eyenga. He didn't play any games for the Cavaliers and was waived 2 days later on March 17.

Panathinaikos (2012–2013) 
On November 15, 2012, he signed with Panathinaikos, of the Euroleague and Greek League. However, his arrival in Greece was delayed until December 11, as he remained in the United States, due to complications with his wife's pregnancy. He won the Greek Cup with Panathinaikos in 2013. In March, he decided to leave the team, due to limited playing opportunities.

Retirement 
Kapono reportedly retired in May 2014. However, on October 4, 2014, he signed with the Golden State Warriors. He was later waived by the Warriors on October 24, 2014, after appearing in five preseason games. Kapono never played in the NBA again.

NBA record
At one point, Kapono was the most accurate three-point shooter in NBA history.  On November 25, 2007, he made his 250th three-point shot, qualifying him for the NBA record in 3-point shooting accuracy.  He immediately moved into first place with a .461 ratio of 3-point shots made to shots attempted, moving ahead of Steve Kerr, who had the previous lifetime best at .454. Kapono has since dropped behind Kerr and others.

Career statistics

NBA

Regular season 

|-
| style="text-align:left;"| 
| style="text-align:left;"| Cleveland
| 41 || 3 || 10.4 || .403 || .477 || .833 || 1.3 || .3 || .3 || .0 || 3.5
|-
| style="text-align:left;"| 
| style="text-align:left;"| Charlotte
| 81 || 14 || 18.4 || .401 || .412 || .824 || 2.0 || .8 || .5 || .1 || 8.5
|-
| style="text-align:left;background:#afe6ba;"| †
| style="text-align:left;"| Miami
| 51 || 2 || 13.0 || .446 || .396 || .848 || 1.4 || .7 || .1 || .1 || 4.1
|-
| style="text-align:left;"| 
| style="text-align:left;"| Miami
| 67 || 35 || 26.4 || .494 ||style="background:#cfecec;"| .514* || .892 || 2.7 || 1.2 || .6 || .0 || 10.9
|-
| style="text-align:left;"| 
| style="text-align:left;"| Toronto
| 81 || 7 || 18.9 || .488 ||style="background:#cfecec;"| .483* || .860 || 1.5 || .8 || .4 || .0 || 7.2
|-
| style="text-align:left;"| 
| style="text-align:left;"| Toronto
| 80 || 12 || 22.9 || .432 || .428 || .810 || 2.0 || 1.3 || .3 || .0 || 8.2
|-
| style="text-align:left;"| 
| style="text-align:left;"| Philadelphia
| 57 || 12 || 17.1 || .419 || .368 || .600 || 1.2 || .7 || .4 || .1 || 5.7
|-
| style="text-align:left;"| 
| style="text-align:left;"| Philadelphia
| 24 || 2 || 4.7 || .250 || .125 || .500 || .5 || .2 || .1 || .0 || .7
|-
| style="text-align:left;"| 
| style="text-align:left;"| L.A. Lakers
| 27 || 0 || 10.0 || .382 || .296 || 1.000 || .5 || .4 || .1 || .0 || 2.0
|- class="sortbottom"
| style="text-align:center;" colspan="2"| Career
| 509 || 87 || 17.8 || .442 || .434 || .835 || 1.7 || .8 || .4 || .0 || 6.7

Playoffs 

|-
| style="text-align:left;background:#afe6ba;"| 2006†
| style="text-align:left;"| Miami
| 1 || 0 || 2.0 || .000 || .000 || .000 || .0 || .0 || .0 || .0 || .0
|-
| style="text-align:left;"| 2007
| style="text-align:left;"| Miami
| 4 || 1 || 19.3 || .471 || .500 || 1.000 || 1.3 || .5 || .5 || .0 || 5.0
|-
| style="text-align:left;"| 2008
| style="text-align:left;"| Toronto
| 5 || 0 || 30.4 || .585 || .542 || .750 || 2.6 || .8 || .4 || .0 || 15.6
|- class="sortbottom"
| style="text-align:center;" colspan="2"| Career
| 10 || 1 || 23.1 || .557 || .536 || .833 || 1.8 || .6 || .4 || .0 || 9.8

EuroLeague

|-
| style="text-align:left;"| 2012–13
| style="text-align:left;" rowspan=1| Panathinaikos
| 8 || 0 || 15.3 || .333 || .462 || .917 || 1.0 || 1.0 || .0 || .0 || 7.4 || 4.4
|- class="sortbottom"
| align="center" colspan="2"| Career
| 8 || 0 || 15.3 || .333 || .462 || .917 || 1.0 || 1.0 || .0 || .0 || 7.4 || 4.4

Personal life
Kapono is of Hawaiian and Portuguese descent. He has a sister, Jillian. On August 28, 2004, he married Ashley Kapono (née Cline) and together they have four children. His father-in-law Tony Cline played football at the University of Miami and in the NFL for the Oakland Raiders, while his brother-in-law Tony Cline Jr. played football at Stanford University and with the Buffalo Bills and San Francisco 49ers.

See also

 Toronto Raptors accomplishments and records

Notes

References

External links
 
 Euroleague.net Profile
 Eurobasket.com Profile

1981 births
Living people
American expatriate basketball people in Canada
American expatriate basketball people in Greece
American men's basketball players
American people of Native Hawaiian descent
American people of Portuguese descent
Basketball players from Long Beach, California
Charlotte Bobcats expansion draft picks
Charlotte Bobcats players
Cleveland Cavaliers draft picks
Cleveland Cavaliers players
Los Angeles Lakers players
McDonald's High School All-Americans
Miami Heat players
Native Hawaiian sportspeople
Panathinaikos B.C. players
Parade High School All-Americans (boys' basketball)
Philadelphia 76ers players
Small forwards
Toronto Raptors players
UCLA Bruins men's basketball players